František Poláček (20 January 1940 – 13 November 2017) was a Czechoslovak boxer. He competed in the men's light heavyweight event at the 1964 Summer Olympics.

In the course of Prague Spring in 1968, Poláček emigrated to West Germany, where he lived until his death in November 2017.

References

1940 births
2017 deaths
Czech male boxers
Czechoslovak male boxers
Olympic boxers of Czechoslovakia
Boxers at the 1964 Summer Olympics
Czechoslovak emigrants to Germany
Place of birth missing
Light-heavyweight boxers
Sportspeople from Brno